Pune - Kamakhya Suvidha Special Express is a Passenger express train of the Indian Railways connecting Pune in Maharashtra and Kamakhya Junction in Assam. It is currently being operated with 82355/82356 train numbers on a daily basis.

Service

It averages 54 km/hr as 82505 Pune - Kamakhya Suvidha Special Express starts on Thursday and covers 2841 km in 52 hrs 55 mins & 60 km/hr as 82356 Kamakhya - Pune CST Suvidha Express and covers 2841 km in 51 hrs 45 mins.

Route and halts

Coach composite

The train consists of 16 coaches:
 1 AC II Tier
 3 AC III Tier
 6 Sleeper Coaches
 2 Second-class Luggage/parcel van
 1 pantry car

See also

References 
82505/Pune - Kamakhya Suvidha Special
Kamakhya - Pune Suvidha Special

Rail transport in Bihar
Rail transport in Chhattisgarh
Rail transport in Maharashtra
Rail transport in West Bengal
Rail transport in Jharkhand
Rail transport in Assam
Transport in Pune
Transport in Guwahati
Suvidha Express trains